These hits topped the Dutch Top 40 in 1979.

See also
1979 in music

References

1979 in the Netherlands
1979 record charts
1979